Steve Marchand (born January 10, 1974) is an American politician. He served as the mayor of Portsmouth, New Hampshire, from 2006 to 2008. He is the principal of SRM Consulting, a public affairs and strategic communications firm. Prior to that, he served as the Director of Corporate Relations for the University of New Hampshire. 

Marchand was an early Democratic primary candidate for U.S. Senate for the 2008 election, but he dropped out of the race in 2007 and endorsed former Governor Jeanne Shaheen. Marchand was also a Democratic primary candidate for Governor of New Hampshire in 2016 but was defeated by Colin Van Ostern.

On April 3, 2017, Marchand formally announced his 2018 candidacy for governor but later lost the Democratic primary to Molly Kelly.

Public service 
First elected in 2003 to the Portsmouth City Council, Marchand served on the City Council from 2004–2005 and was re-elected in 2005. He received the highest numbers of votes in the 2005 election, making him Mayor of Portsmouth.

Political campaigns 

In the 2016 election cycle, Marchand was a late entrant in the Democratic primary race for New Hampshire Governor. In a field of five candidates, he placed second with 25.3% of the vote.

Controversy 
During the 2021 Portsmouth, NH City Council race an anonymous text message was blasted out to mostly Democratic party members within the community. The text had a link to an unattributed website called Becksteadfive.com. The website defamed 5 sitting City Councilors who were seen as encumbering a project with a private commercial developer. The website proclaimed, "WORK TO GET A COUNCIL THAT PRESIDENT TRUMP WOULD BE PROUD TO SUPPORT". The website included innuendo that the City Councilors were racists, etc. The City Council elections in Portsmouth, NH have been traditionally non-partisan. Although ex Portsmouth mayor Steve Marchand had moved out of Portsmouth, NH prior, he launched the political website.   

After the election, several of the defeated candidates asked for the NH Attorney General's office to investigate the unattributed and illegal website. In October, 2022, the Attorney General released a letter outlining their investigation of Marchand. The document reads in part:

"On June 21, 2022, Attorney General's Office Investigator Anna Croteau Reached out to you by phone and left a voicemail. You and she spoke by phone the following day. When she first asked you about Preserve-Portsmouth.com, you stated that you had heard of the website. You denied you had ever claimed responsibility for the website, but noted that other people had been saying that you were responsible for it. Investigator Croteau advised you that she was looking at a copy of a Facebook correspondence between you and another individual where you claimed responsibility for the website, and then commented that getting information out to Portsmouth voters about the candidates on the site could be "the difference between winning and losing for most of the Beckstead Five." You then admitted to Investigator Croteau that you were "involved" with the website but you declaimed full responsibility for the site. It was only when investigator Croteau noted that there appeared to be disclosure issues with the site and that she was trying to determine who was responsible that you claimed full responsibility for the site. You stated: "To be very clear, I am the one to create the content."  

"Later in the conversation with Investigator Croteau, you clarified that you were also responsible for another website: Beckstedfivetaxpayerszero.com."

The letter ends by stating, "You are hereby warned against any future violations of RSA 664:14. This component of the matter is closed. "

References

External links 
 Campaign website
 
 Profile at SourceWatch
 Letter from Attorney General

1974 births
Living people
Mayors of Portsmouth, New Hampshire
New Hampshire Democrats
People from Goffstown, New Hampshire
Politicians from Manchester, New Hampshire
Maxwell School of Citizenship and Public Affairs alumni